Vasopressin analogues are chemicals similar in function but not necessarily similar in structure to vasopressin (ADH), such as desmopressin.

Desmopressin is administered as an oral spray to treat diseases where ADH is either not being produced in sufficient amounts, or vasopressin's receptors are not being stimulated by vasopressin. An example of desmopressin's use is for childhood bed-wetting, where it is believed that children's circadian rhythms are not synchronized with normal light-dark cycles, and consequentially the ADH surge normal children experience at night is not experienced in these children. Taking a desmopressin dose 30–45 minutes before sleeping results in concentrated urine production, and the urination reflex experienced when the bladder fills above a certain level is not triggered.

Used in the treatment of diabetes insipidus. They are also used in cirrhosis patients

References

Vasopressin receptor agonists